The Virgin in the Garden is a 1978 realist novel by English novelist A. S. Byatt. Set during the same year as the coronation of Elizabeth II, the novel revolves around a play about Elizabeth I of England. The novel features a strong use of symbolism, which The New York Times called "overloaded", that points towards Elizabeth I. The novel is the first of a quartet featuring Frederica Potter, followed by Still Life (1985), Babel Tower (1996), and A Whistling Woman (2002).

The book features numerous flower metaphors and Byatt described the character of Marcus as "a self-portrait: somebody baffled by things being far too much and not fittable into any of the languages you were offered".

Reception
The New York Times describes the writing of "Byatt is essentially a fine, careful and very traditional storyteller."

In a 1998 interview with Philip Hensher, published in The Paris Review in 2001, Byatt commented on a piece which John Sutherland had written in The Bookseller recently claiming that The Virgin in the Garden was "completely unreadable, and that he and a colleague of his and mine at University College had a bet about whether any of them could finish it and none of them could! He actually published that. So I'm always deeply surprised when anyone says anybody is reading it".

References

Further reading
 
 

1978 British novels
Chatto & Windus books
English novels
Novels by A. S. Byatt